The Football Conference season of 1986–87 (known as the GM Vauxhall Conference for sponsorship reasons) was the eighth season of the Football Conference, the first season under this name, this league having earlier been known as the Alliance Premier League.

Overview
This was the first season of automatic promotion for champions of the Conference, following the abolition of the re-election system, and automatic relegation to the Conference for the bottom placed team in the Football League Fourth Division. Scarborough finished the season as Conference champions, and so won automatic promotion to the Football League at the expense of Lincoln City.

New teams in the league this season
 Gateshead (promoted 1985–86)
 Sutton United (promoted 1985–86)
 Welling United (promoted 1985–86)

Final league table

Results

Topscorers

Promotion and relegation

Promoted
 Scarborough (to the Football League Fourth Division)
 Fisher Athletic (from the Isthmian League)
 Macclesfield Town (from the Northern Premier League)
 Wycombe Wanderers (from the Southern Premier League)

Relegated
 Lincoln City (from the Football League Fourth Division)
 Frickley Athletic (to the Northern Premier League)
 Gateshead (to the Northern Premier League)
 Nuneaton Borough (to the Southern Premier League)

References

External links
 1986–87 Conference National Results

National League (English football) seasons
5